Zakariya Town, named after Baha-ud-din Zakariya, is a residential area located on the famous Bosan Road in Multan, province of Punjab in the Islamic Republic of Pakistan. Zakariya town is one of the prestigious addresses in Multan to live.

It is a locality of 45 streets.
Each street contains approximately 30 houses and a total of 10506 residents. The town is having poor infrastructure and sewerage problems.

It is one of the large housing schemes and one of the elite class area in the city of Multan.

Populated places in Multan District